Darb-e Raz (also Romanized as Darb Raz; also known as Darb-e Zar, Dar-e Borz, and Dar-e Raz) is a village in Kezab Rural District, Khezrabad District, Saduq County, Yazd Province, Iran. At the 2006 census, its population was 86, in 27 families.

References 

Populated places in Saduq County